Cwmpengraig is a rural hamlet in Wales, located in the Teifi Valley approximately  from the village of Dre-fach Felindre.

Woollen mills & trails 
Cwmpengraig is part of the Carmarthen Heritage Trails and also the Discover Carmathenshire ramblers trail for Dre-fach Felindre. Located just 1.5 miles from Dre-fach Felindre, Cwmpengraig is a small community with a history of woollen mill production. 
In the early 19th century, furling mills were established in Pentrecwrt, Dolwyon, Drefach and Cwmpengraig. By the beginning of the 20th century, substantial mills were built, employing 50-100 people. Mill cottages were built to house the employees although by the end of the 1920s the industry went into decline.

The Hamlet 
Through the centre of the hamlet runs the stream Nant Esgair which flows down into the rural village of Dre-fach Felindre. At the centre of the hamlet is Soar Chapel. A number of mill cottages still exist along the river valley.

References

Villages in Carmarthenshire